Kortenaken is a municipality located in the Belgian province of Flemish Brabant. The municipality comprises the towns of Hoeleden, Kersbeek-Miskom, Kortenaken proper, Ransberg and Waanrode. On January 1, 2014, Kortenaken had a total population of 7,881. The total area is 49.06 km² which gives a population density of 160,63 inhabitants per km².

Every year in August there used to be a three-day festival in Kortenaken, named Boerenrock, with electro music on Friday, rock music and a party on Saturday, and on Sunday music aimed at children and their parents. The final edition of this festival took place in 2016.

References

External links
 
 Gazetteer Entry

Municipalities of Flemish Brabant